Black Current or Black Currents can refer to:

 Black Current, electric car
 Kuroshio Current in the western Pacific Ocean
 Black Currents, album by Rachel Sermanni
 Dark current (physics), the electric current that flows through a photosensitive device when no photons are entering the device

See also
Black currant (disambiguation)